Events from the year 1996 in Scotland.

Incumbents 

 Secretary of State for Scotland and Keeper of the Great Seal – Michael Forsyth

Law officers 
 Lord Advocate – Lord Mackay of Drumadoon
 Solicitor General for Scotland – Paul Cullen

Judiciary 
 Lord President of the Court of Session and Lord Justice General – Lord Hope until 1 October; then Lord Rodger of Earlsferry
 Lord Justice Clerk – Lord Ross
 Chairman of the Scottish Land Court – Lord Philip, then Lord McGhie

Events 
 13 March – Dunblane school massacre – a gunman kills sixteen children, their teacher and himself at a primary school in Dunblane, Stirling. The killer, who wounded thirteen other children and another teacher, is quickly identified as 43-year-old former scout leader Thomas Watt Hamilton.
 1 April – The Local Government etc. (Scotland) Act 1994 takes effect with 32 unitary councils replacing the 9 Regional Councils, 53 District Councils and 3 unitary authorities that had been established under the Local Government (Scotland) Act 1973.
 18 May – Rangers F.C., who have already won the Scottish Football League title, complete the Scottish double by beating Hearts 5–1 in the Scottish Cup final.
 5 July – Dolly the sheep, the first mammal to have been successfully cloned from an adult cell, is born at The Roslin Institute in Midlothian.
 October – The Shetland Times and The Shetland News become involved in a landmark legal case over alleged copyright infringement and deep linking in their websites.
 9 November – Irvine, North Ayrshire, is designated a New Town, the last of the five created in Scotland.
 30 November (St. Andrew's Day) – The Stone of Scone is installed in Edinburgh Castle 700 years after it was removed from Scotland by King Edward I of England.
 Edinburgh Old Town and New Town become the first World Heritage Site in mainland Scotland.
 First of the Maggie's Centres for drop-in cancer care in the UK opens in Edinburgh.

Births 
 13 January – Craig Storie, footballer 
 8 February – Jaison McGrath, footballer
 1 March – Lizzie Arnot, footballer
 15 March – Seonaid McIntosh, sport shooter
 19 March – Kaiya Jones, actress
 9 May – Grace Reid, diver
 3 August – Robert MacIntyre, golfer
 10 August – Lauren Tait, netball player

Deaths 
 23 January – Norman MacCaig, poet (born 1910)
 6 March – Stanley Booth-Clibborn, retired bishop of Manchester (born 1924 in London)
 19 March – W. H. Murray, mountaineer and writer (born 1913)
 13 April – George Mackay Brown, poet (born 1921)
 14 April – David Brand, Lord Brand, advocate, sheriff and Senator of the College of Justice (born 1923)
 16 August – Eric Cullen, actor famous for playing "Wee Burnie" in Rab C. Nesbitt (born 1965)
 24 November – Sorley MacLean, poet (born 1911)

The arts
 January – Indie pop band Belle and Sebastian is formed in Glasgow; on 6 June their debut album Tigermilk is released.
 James MacMillan's first opera Inés de Castro is premièred by Scottish Opera in Glasgow.
 Gallery of Modern Art in Glasgow opens.

See also 
 1996 in Northern Ireland

References 

 
Scotland
Years of the 20th century in Scotland
1990s in Scotland